Robert Stone is a British-American documentary filmmaker. His work has been screened at dozens of film festivals and televised around the world, notably seven of his films have appeared on PBS's American Experience series and four of his films have premiered at the Sundance Film Festival  (including Closing Night Film in 2009). He is an Oscar nominee for Best Feature Documentary and a three-time Emmy nominee for Exceptional Merit in Documentary Filmmaking.

Life and career
Stone was born in England and educated in the United States. His father Lawrence Stone was a noted historian and chair of the History Department at Princeton University in Princeton, New Jersey where Robert grew up, graduating Princeton High School in 1976. He was later educated at the University of Wisconsin at Madison, did a brief stint at Sorbonne University in Paris and at the Lee Strasberg Theatre and Film Institute in New York. Known in large part for his innovative use of archival material in historical documentaries, Stone has directed several well received documentaries that he has shot himself, including American Babylon (2000) and, most recently, Pandora's Promise (2013), which makes the environmental case for nuclear energy as a solution to climate change.
 

His only foray into fiction filmmaking was a counter-factual fake historical documentary for German television called World War Three in 1998.  In addition to his work making feature-documentaries, in the early 1990s he was commissioned to create a 24-part semi-interactive permanent installation at the JFK Presidential Library in Boston. His work with environmental issues, particularly the worldwide acclaim surrounding his film Pandora's Promise, led him to co-found the non-profit clean energy advocacy group Energy for Humanity  with environmental campaigner Kirsty Gogan and philanthropist Daniel Aegerter. Stone is also one of 18 co-authors of the Ecomodernist Manifesto which challenges conventional thinking about the meaning of sustainable development. He also co-authored a companion book of the same name to be published by Ballantine Books.   Stone lives in New York's Hudson Valley with his wife, Shelby Stone, a film and television produce, and his two sons, Luc and Caleb, from a previous marriage.

Accolades
His debut work was the Academy Award-nominated Radio Bikini (1988), about nuclear tests performed around Bikini Atoll in 1946. Starting in 2017, Stone wrote, directed and edited a 6-hour documentary mini-series for PBS called Chasing the Moon, an epic political and social history of the space race. The film aired in 2019 coinciding with the 50th anniversary of the first lunar landing, earning Stone his third Emmy nomination for Exceptional Merit in Documentary Filmmaking and his second nomination the Writers Guild of America Award for Best Documentary Screenplay, and a duPont-Columbia Award among many other awards. 

Entertainment Weekly film critic Owen Gleiberman stated that Stone "may be the most under-celebrated great documentary filmmaker in America." His films Guerrilla: The Taking of Patty Hearst (2004) and Oswald's Ghost (2008) both received Emmy nominations for Exceptional Merit in Documentary Filmmaking; Gleiberman  hailed them as "two of the most explosively insightful documentaries of the last decade". For Earth Days (2009), Stone received a nomination for the Writers Guild of America Award for Best Documentary Screenplay.

Filmography
Radio Bikini (1988) 
The Satellite Sky (1990)
Farewell, Good Brothers (1992) 
World War Three (1998) aka Der Dritte Weltkrieg
American Babylon (2000)
Guerrilla: The Taking of Patty Hearst (2004)  aka Neverland: The Rise and Fall of the Symbionese Liberation Army
Hollywood Vietnam (2005)
Oswald's Ghost (2008)
The Civilian Conservation Corps (2009; broadcast by PBS's American Experience)
Earth Days (2009)
Pandora's Promise (2013)
Cold War Roadshow (2014)
Chasing the Moon (2019)
Taken Hostage (2022)

An Ecomodernist Manifesto
In April 2015, Stone joined with a group of scholars in issuing An Ecomodernist Manifesto. The other authors were: John Asafu-Adjaye, Linus Blomqvist, Stewart Brand, Barry Brook. Ruth DeFries, Erle Ellis, Christopher Foreman, David Keith, Martin Lewis, Mark Lynas, Ted Nordhaus, Roger A. Pielke Jr., Rachel Pritzker, Joyashree Roy, Mark Sagoff, Michael Shellenberger, and Peter Teague

References

External links

 Robert Stone Productions

American documentary filmmakers
American Experience
British emigrants to the United States
Living people
Film directors from New Jersey
Film directors from New York City
Place of birth missing (living people)
University of Wisconsin–Madison alumni
Year of birth missing (living people)
People from Princeton, New Jersey
Princeton High School (New Jersey) alumni
British environmentalists